Diacetylene (also known as butadiyne) is the organic compound with the formula C4H2.  It is the simplest compound containing two triple bonds. It is first in the series of polyynes, which are of theoretical but not of practical interest.

Occurrence
Diacetylene has been identified in the atmosphere of Titan and in the protoplanetary nebula CRL 618 by its characteristic vibrational spectrum. It is proposed to arise by a reaction between acetylene and the ethynyl radical (C2H), which is produced when acetylene undergoes photolysis. This radical can in turn attack the triple bond in acetylene and react efficiently even at low temperatures.  Diacetylene has also been detected on the Moon.

Preparation
This compound may be made by the dehydrohalogenation of 1,4-dichloro-2-butyne by potassium hydroxide (in alcoholic medium) at ~70°C:
 ClCH2C#CCH2Cl  +  2 KOH  -> HC#C-C#CH  +  2 KCl  + 2 H2O

The bis(trimethylsilyl)-protected derivative may be prepared by the Hay coupling of (trimethylsilyl)acetylene:
2 Me3Si-C#CH -> Me3Si-C#C-C#C-SiMe3

See also
 Acetylene
 Diiodobutadiyne
 Butenyne
 Hydrocarbon

References

Further reading
 

Conjugated diynes